Joint-stock company Mostransavto is a state-owned joint-stock company for passenger bus transport in Moscow Oblast with daily throughput of 2.3 million passengers. It obtains up to 4000 buses, operates 1209 different routes as well as 44 bus terminals and terminal stations.

In 2019, Mostransavto was reorganised from a state-owned enterprise into a joint-stock company, completely owned by the Government of Moscow Oblast.

Bus terminals and bus stations in Moscow Oblast 

44 bus terminals and bus stations in Moscow Oblast are owned and operated by Mostransavto.

Bus terminals 

 Chekhov Bus Terminal
 Dmitrov Bus Terminal
 Domodedovo Bus Terminal
 Klin Bus Terminal
 Kolomna Bus Terminal
 Lukhovitsy Bus Terminal
 Mozhaysk Bus Terminal
 Mytishchi Bus Terminal
 Noginsk Bus Terminal
 Orekhovo-Zuyevo Bus Terminal
 Ramenskoye Bus Terminal
 Sergiyev Posad Bus Terminal
 Stupino Bus Terminal
 Volokolamsk Bus Terminal
 Voskresensk Bus Terminal
 Yegoryevsk Bus Terminal
 Zaraysk Bus Terminal

Bus stations 

 ″Yuzhnaya″ Bus Station, Balashikha
 ″Zvyozdnaya″ Bus Station, Balashikha
 Bronnitsy Bus Station
 Chernogolovka Bus Station
 Elektrogorsk Bus Station
 Fryazino Bus Station
 ″Staraya Kolomna″ Bus Station, Kolomna
 Krasnoarmeysk Bus Station
 Kurovskoe Bus Station
 Lotoshino Bus Station
 Lytkarino Bus Station
 Ozyory Bus Station
 Pavlovsky Posad Bus Station
 ″Podolsk station″ Bus Station, Podolsk
 Protvino Bus station
 Pushchino Bus Station
 Pushkino Bus Station
 Roshal Bus Station
 Ruza Bus Station
 Serebryanye Prudy Bus Station
 Serpukhov Bus Station
 Shakhovskaya Bus Station
 Shatura Bus Station
 Solnechnogorsk Bus Station
 Taldom Bus Station
 Vereya Bus Station

Mostransavto also operates a passenger service complex at Kashira station, Kashira.

See also

Mosgortrans

References 

Bus companies of Russia
Transport in Moscow Oblast
Companies based in Moscow

Companies based in Moscow Oblast